Cryptobacterium curtum is a Gram-positive anaerobic rod bacteria isolated from human mouths.

Description
Cryptobacterium curtum are Gram-positive, obligately anaerobic, non-spore-forming, and rod-shaped bacteria. C. curtum has been isolated from a periodontal pocket sample of an adult patient and from necrotic dental pulp, respectively. C. curtum can also be isolated from human oral and dental infections like pulpal inflammations, advanced caries, dental abscesses or periodontitis. While C. curtum does not appear to be present in the normal microflora, the nearly double in population size when periodontitis is present. The cells are very short and can occur singly or in masses. These cells are inert in most biochemical tests. They do not hydrolyze starch or aesculin. They cannot reduce nitrate nor do they grow in the presence or absence of carbohydrates. C. curtum also had negative results for indole, catalase, and urease tests.

Genome analysis
According to Mavrommatis and colleagues, the genome of C. curtum is 1,617,804 base pairs long.  Of the 1422 genes predicted, 1364 were protein-coding genes, and were 58 RNAs. The majority of the genome (78.5%) is made up of protein-coding genes. A 16S rRNA gene sequence analysis revealed that the two isolates represent a distinct lineage within the family Coriobacteriaceae, between the neighboring genera Eggerthella and Slackia. After sequencing, they found that the DNA G+C content is 50–51 molecular %.

Metabolic characteristics
Cryptobacterium curtum is asaccharolytic and unreactive in many of the conventional biochemical tests. Instead, it is able to degrade arginine and other amino acids found in oral cavities by using the arginine deiminase pathway. This bacterium is able to degrade arginine and produce substantial amounts of citrulline, ornithine and ammonia. Arginine and citrulline support the growth and reproduction of C. curtum.

References

External links
Type strain of Cryptobacterium curtum at BacDive -  the Bacterial Diversity Metadatabase

Actinomycetota
Coriobacteriaceae
Bacteria described in 1999